Claudinei Dutra de Resende (22 May 1978 – 6 November 2004), commonly known as Claudinei, was a Brazilian professional footballer who played as a midfielder.

Claudinei started his career with Atlético Mineiro and also played for Cruzeiro.

He joined Swedish club Helsingborgs IF in autumn 2003. He returned to Brazil in May 2004, midway through the 2004 season, without telling the club.

On 6 November 2004, Claudinei died by a shot in the head during a shooting at a concert hall west of Belo Horizonte which was caused by a clash between gangs linked to drug trafficking, according to Brazilian police.

References

External links
 

1978 births
2004 deaths
Association football midfielders
Brazilian footballers
Brazilian expatriate footballers
Expatriate footballers in Sweden
Male murder victims
Allsvenskan players
Clube Atlético Mineiro players
Cruzeiro Esporte Clube players
Helsingborgs IF players
Deaths by firearm in Brazil
Brazilian murder victims
People murdered in Brazil